"Are You the One?" is the lead single by Australian electronic dance music duo The Presets, from their debut studio album Beams. The single backed with non-album tracks "Truth and Lies" and "Midnight Boundary", as well a remix of "Girl and the Sea" by Cut Copy was released on 24 October 2005. The song peaked at No. 68 on the ARIA singles charts.

The UK version of the single (which appeared in early 2006) featured remixes by Simian Mobile Disco and Van She. A remix of the song by French DJ, Lifelike, was commissioned in 2008 to feature in a BMW 1 Series commercial in Australia.

Reviews
A review on Sputnik Music describes the song as "absolutely fanstastic, the best on the album, and the catchiest." Dan Raper at Popmatters states "the beat is a semitone-rumble of distorted fuzz, the vocals, thrown off with the yelp of Green Velvet in “La La Land”, and the chorus is anthemic, defiant, addictive." Marc Hogan at Pitchfork Media however states that it is tuneless and "all hoovering bass and forgettable lyrics".

In 2015, the song was listed at number 41 in In the Mix's 100 Greatest Australian Dance Tracks of All Time with Nick Jarvis calling it "[an] aggressive dance-punk track custom made for sweaty basements" and said "[its] perfectly capturing the keen anticipation and anxiety of a loose night spent getting to know a potential new bedmate."

Music video
The music video, which was directed by Moyes, was nominated for Best Video at the 2006 ARIA Music Awards.

Track listing

Release history

References

The Presets songs
2005 singles
Songs written by Julian Hamilton
Songs written by Kim Moyes
2005 songs